This article shows all participating team squads at the 2015 FIVB Volleyball Men's Club World Championship, held from 27 to 31 October 2015 in Betim, Brazil.

Pool A

Sada Cruzeiro

Zenit Kazan

Capitanes de Arecibo
The following is the roster of the Swiss club Capitanes de Arecibo in the 2015 FIVB Club World Championship.

Head coach:  David Aleman

Pool B

UPCN San Juan

Paykan Tehran

Al-Ahly

References

External links
Official website

C
2015 in volleyball